Gabriel Darío Carrasco (born 7 March 1997) is an Argentine professional footballer who plays as a right-back for Argentine Primera División side Godoy Cruz on loan from Lanús.

Career

Club
Carrasco joined Lanús as a youth player, he played once for the club versus São Paulo at the 2016 U-20 Copa Libertadores in Paraguay. He was promoted into Lanús' first-team during the 2016–17 Argentine Primera División season, making his debut during a 3–0 defeat away to Racing Club. In January 2018, Carrasco scored his first senior goal in a home draw against Patronato. On 16 December 2019 it was confirmed, that Carrasco had joined Godoy Cruz on loan with an option to buy.

In March 2021, Carrasco joined Santamarina. A few months later, at the end of July 2021, Carrasco moved to Atlanta, signing a deal until the end of 2022.

International
Carrasco was selected by the Argentina U20s for Claudio Úbeda's pre-2017 FIFA U-20 World Cup training squad, but he wasn't picked for the final tournament.

Career statistics
.

References

External links

1997 births
Living people
People from Banfield, Buenos Aires
Argentine footballers
Association football defenders
Argentine Primera División players
Club Atlético Lanús footballers
Godoy Cruz Antonio Tomba footballers
Club y Biblioteca Ramón Santamarina footballers
Club Atlético Atlanta footballers
Sportspeople from Buenos Aires Province